Deh-e Shir Khan (also Romanized as Deh-e Shīr Khān and Deh Shīr Khān) is a village in Javersiyan Rural District, Qareh Chay District, Khondab County, Markazi Province, Iran. At the 2006 census, its population was 1,034, in 284 families.

References 

Populated places in Khondab County